The 1946 All-American Girls Professional Baseball League season marked the fourth season of the circuit. The AAGPBL expansion brought two new franchises to the previous six-team format. At this point, the Muskegon Lassies and the Peoria Redwings joined the Fort Wayne Daisies, Grand Rapids Chicks, Kenosha Comets, Racine Belles, Rockford Peaches and South Bend Blue Sox. The eight teams competed through a 112-game schedule, while the final Shaugnessy playoffs faced season winner Racine against defending champion Rockford in a Best of Seven Series.

Other modifications occurred in the league during 1946. The ball was decreased in size from 11½ inches to 11 inches. In addition, the base paths were lengthened to 70 feet and the sidearm pitching was introduced, as the league was moving toward baseball.

Several pitching records were set during the season. Racine's Anna Mae Hutchison recorded two marks that would never be broken: most innings pitched in a single game (19 against Peoria) and most games pitched in a single season (51). For their part, Fort Wayne's Dorothy Wiltse set the mark for more strikeouts in a season (294), and Racine's Joanne Winter a record for the most consecutive scoreless innings (63). The untiring Wiltse also pitched and won both games of a doubleheader (August 25).

Other highlights included Grand Rapids' Connie Wisniewski, who led all pitchers with a 0.96 earned run average. Besides this, Winter and Wisniewski combined for 33 wins a piece, the best ever in league history. In addition, Fort Wayne's Audrey Haine and South Bend's Doris Barr and Betty Luna hurled no-hitters. The only position player to top the .300 mark was Rockford's Dorothy Kamenshek (.316), proving that strong pitching is more important than having hot bats.

For the second consecutive season, one team won both the season title and the championship. Racine defeated South Bend in the first round, three games to one, and beat the defending champion Rockford in the best-of-seven series in six games. Racine was led by Winter, who won four games in the two playoffs, including a 15-inning, 1–0 victory in the final game of the Shaugnessy series. The Belles also received offensive support from Sophie Kurys, who batted an average of .372 (16-for-43) in 10 playoff games, while setting a postseason record with 16 stolen bases. Kurys also was honored with the AAGPBL Player of the Year Award, after hit a second-best .286 while leading with 201 stolen bases and 117 runs.

In the first three years after World War II, AAGPBL teams often attracted between two and three thousand fans to a single game. One league highlight occurred in 1946, when an estimated 10,000 people saw a Fourth of July doubleheader in South Bend, Indiana.

Final standings

Postseason

Batting statistics

Pitching statistics

All-Star Game

See also
1946 Major League Baseball season
1946 Japanese Baseball League season

Sources

External links
AAGPBL Official Website
AAGPBL Records
Baseball Historian files
The Diamond Angle profiles and interviews
SABR Projects – Jim Sargent articles
YouTube videos

All-American Girls Professional Baseball League seasons
1940s in women's baseball
All-American Girls Professional Baseball League season
All-American Girls Professional Baseball League season